David Havern is an American football coach and former player.  He was a quarterback for the University of Pittsburgh football team in the 1960s, a Dapper Dan award winner, who would hold the school passing records before the arrival of Dan Marino in 1979. More recently, Havern was a mentor to St. Louis Rams quarterback Marc Bulger when Bulger was attending Pitt's rival, West Virginia.

Havern was the head football coach of the Shady Side Academy bull dogs in Pittsburgh. He retired in 2017, but remains a football consultant and mentor.

References

Year of birth missing (living people)
Living people
American football quarterbacks
Pittsburgh Panthers football players
High school football coaches in Pennsylvania